Purab ki Awaz is an Indian Historical drama film directed by Chandra Mudoi and produced by Loknath Deka. the film features Urmila Mahanta, Nipon Goswami, Debashis Borthakur, Rina Bora and others. this film release in All India on 10 March and will be releasing soon in Assam in August 2017.

Plot

One of the country's youngest and most influential freedom fighters ever, Kanaklata became a martyr of Indian freedom struggle at the tender age of just 14 years, on 20 September 1942. She was shot dead by the British while she was attempting to hoist the Indian national flag. Recently, a function was held to mark the death anniversary of Birangana Kanaklata at the Guwahati Press Club, wherein the bilingual films in Assamese and Hindi, depicting the life and sacrifice of this outstanding symbol of resistance, entitled ‘Epah Phulil Epah Soril’ and ‘Purab Ki Awaz’ respectively, now in their post production stages, were announced, amidst an august gathering. The films made under the banner of ‘L.P.K.G. Film Production’, is produced by Loknath Deka and directed by the well-known filmmaker Chandra Mudoi.

Cast

 Urmila Mahanta as Kanaklata Baruah
 Nipon Goswami
 Debashis Borthakur
 Rina Bora
 Tapan Sharma
 Deepjyoti Keot

Production

This film produced by Loknath Deka. The film's chief assistant director is Dipak Roy, assistant director Shapnajit Borkakati, music direction by Dr Hitesh Baruah, Ajay Phukan and Tapan Kakati, lyricists cinematography by Naba Kumar Das, editing by Syamal Das, make-up by Biswa and Dhan, production controller Khargeswar Bora.

Soundtrack

References

External links
 Purab Ki Awaz at Bollywoodmdb
 Purab Ki Awaaz in Bookmyshow

2010s historical drama films
Indian historical drama films
2010s Hindi-language films
Indian multilingual films
2017 multilingual films
2010s Assamese-language films
2017 drama films